The 1944 season was the Hawthorn Football Club's 20th season in the Victorian Football League and 43rd overall.

Fixture

Premiership Season

The VFL went back to an 18-round season after  rejoined the competition due to the wartime travel restriction being relaxed.

Ladder

References

Hawthorn Football Club seasons